Olavi is a Finnish masculine given name from Olav/Olaf name. Notable people with the name include:

Olavi Ahonen (1923–2000), Finnish film actor
Olavi Alakulppi (1915–1990), Finnish cross country skier who competed in the 1930s
Olavi Hänninen (1920–1992), Finnish designer
Joose Olavi Hannula (1900–1944), Finnish colonel and historian
Olavi Kuronen (1923–1989), Finnish ski jumper who competed in the 1950s
Olavi Laiho (1907–1944), the last Finn to be executed in Finland
Olavi Larkas (1913–1984), Finnish Olympic fencer and modern pentathlete
Olavi Litmanen (born 1945), Finnish former international footballer
Olavi Mäenpää (born 1950), Finnish politician and chairman of Suomen Kansan Sinivalkoiset, a far right political party
Olavi Ojanperä (1921–2016), Finnish sprint canoeist who competed in the early 1950s
Olavi Paavolainen (1903–1964), Finnish essayist, journalist, travel book writer, poet, and cosmopolitan
Olavi Rove (1915–1966), Finnish gymnast and Olympic Champion
Olavi Sihvonen, a Finnish Nordic combined skier who competed in the 1940s
Martti Olavi Siirala (1922–2008), Finnish psychiatrist, psychoanalyst and philosopher
Olavi Suomalainen (born 1947), Finnish former marathon runner
Olavi Svanberg, Finnish ski-orienteering competitor and world champion
Olavi Tuomi (1932–2006), Finnish cinematographer
Olavi Uusivirta (born 1983), Finnish rock/pop singer, songwriter and actor
Olavi Virta (originally to 1926 Oskari Olavi Ilmen) (1915–1972), Finnish singer, acclaimed as the king of Finnish tango
Vaino Olavi Partanen, member of the Canadian Forces and a recipient of the Cross of Valour
Olavi Salonen (born 23 December 1933), Finnish former 1500 metres world record holder
Olavi Salsola (1933–1995), Finnish former 1500 metres world record holder
Olavi Vuorisalo (born 1933), Finnish former 1500 metres world record holder

See also
2573 Hannu Olavi, a main-belt asteroid

Finnish masculine given names
Estonian masculine given names